Sweden held its European Parliament election to nominate Sweden's 18 members of the European Parliament on 13 June 2004. The election was held in the same week as 24 other member states.

Results

Results by county
The Swedish results are counted by county only, since the seats are shared on a national basis, rendering eight fewer counting areas than in Riksdag elections.

Percentage share

By votes

Municipal results

Blekinge

Dalarna

Gotland

Gävleborg

Halland

Jämtland

Jönköping

Kalmar

Kronoberg

Norrbotten

Skåne

Stockholm

Södermanland

Uppsala

Värmland

Västerbotten

Västernorrland

Västmanland

Västra Götaland

Örebro

Östergötland

References

2004 results
2004 elections in Sweden